Hanumatodi, more popularly known as Todi (pronounced hanumatōdi and tōdi), is a rāgam (musical scale) in Carnatic music. It is the 8th melakarta rāgam (parent scale) in the 72 melakarta rāgam system. This is sung very often in concerts. It is a difficult rāgam to perform in owing to its complexity in prayoga (phrases of notes and intonation). It is called Janatodi in Muthuswami Dikshitar school of Carnatic music. Its Western equivalent is the Phrygian mode. Todi in Carnatic music is different from Todi (thaat) of Hindustani music (North Indian classical music). The equivalent of the Hindustani raga Todi in Carnatic music is Shubhapantuvarali (which is the 45th melakarta). The equivalent of Carnatic Todi in Hindustani is Bhairavi thaat in terms of notes, but the two sound very different due to differing uses of gamakas.

Structure and Lakshana

It is the 2nd rāgam in the 2nd chakra Netra. The mnemonic name is Netra-Sri. The mnemonic phrase is sa ra gi ma pa dha ni. Its ārohaṇa-avarohaṇa structure is as follows (see swaras in Carnatic music page for details on below notation and terms):
ārohaṇa : 
avarohaṇa : 

This scale uses the notes shuddha rishabham, sadharana gandharam, shuddha madhyamam, shuddha dhaivatham and kaisiki nishadham. It is a sampoorna rāgam - rāgam having all 7 swarams. It is the shuddha madhyamam equivalent of Bhavapriya, which is the 44th melakarta scale. A peculiarity of this raga is that it is sung in all lower notes. It is also classified as a "rakti" raga (a raga of high melodic content).

Janya rāgams 
Hanumatodi has a quite a few janya rāgams (derived scales) associated with it, of which Asaveri, Janatodi, Dhanyasi, Punnagavarali and Shuddha Seemanthini are popular. See List of janya rāgams for all of Todi's janyas.

Popular compositions
Most composers have composed songs in Todi. Thyagaraja alone has composed about 32 compositions in this raga with each composition starting at every single note of the three octaves. Thāye Yashoda, composed by Oottukkadu Venkata Kavi, is a very well known composition, in the Tamil language. This popular kriti is sung frequently in concerts. A popular varnam in the Todi rāgam is Erā Nāpai by Patnam Subramania Iyer, one of the famous composers of Carnatic music.

Other popular compositions are:

 Era Na Pai an Aadi thala varnam by Patnam Subramania Iyer
 Daani Samajendra, Saridisavasa (Varnams) by Swathi Thirunal
 Kādhanu vāriki, Dācu kovalena, Proddupoyenu, Dasarathi Nee Runamu, Aragimpave, Raju Vedale, Endu daginado, Chesinadella, Koluvamaregada, Nee vanti daivamu sadanana and Gati Neevani by Thyagaraja 
  Sarasijanabha Murare, Devadevamam Palaya, Japatha Japatha, Devadeva Mam Palayamam, Mandara Dhara, Pankajaksha Tava Sevam, Samodam Kalayami  by Swathi Thirunal
 Shri Krishnam Bhajamaanasa, Daakshayani,Shri Subramanyomam Rakshatu and Kamalambike by Muthuswami Dikshitar
 Raave Himagiri Kumari, Karunanidhi Ilalo by Syama Sastri
 Kangalidyatako by Sripadaraja
 Enu Dhanyalo Lakumi, Banda nodi Govinda, Ninna Nodi Dhanyanadeno by Purandara Dasa
 Sharadeye Karuna Varidhi Ny Vijaya Dasa
 Gajananam Ganapathim by Jayachamarajendra Wodeyar
 Kārthikeya Gangeya and Thamatham aen swami by Papanasam Sivan
 Paradevathe Nin Pada Bhajanam by Irayimman Thampi
 varnam miinakshi niidu by gnanananda teertha (ogirala veera raghava sarma)
SarasijanAbha MurArE by Swati Tirunal* 
 kriti kamakshi sada by gnanananda teertha (ogirala veera raghava sarma)
 Anjaneyam upasmahe by Bellary M. Sheshagiri Acharya
 Ninne namminanu by Shyama Shastri
 Notru Suvargam part of the Thiruppavai by Andal
 Sudha Nidhe Mamava Sadha by Balamurali Krishna

Film Songs

Language:Tamil

Related rāgams

Todi's notes when shifted using Graha bhedam, yields 5 other major melakarta rāgams, namely, Kalyani, Shankarabharanam, Natabhairavi, Kharaharapriya and Harikambhoji. For further details and an illustration of graha bhedam of this rāgam refer related rāgams section in Shankarabharanam page.

Notes

References

Melakarta ragas